Aloe emodin (1,8-dihydroxy-3-(hydroxymethyl)anthraquinone) is an anthraquinone and an isomer of emodin present in aloe latex, an exudate from the aloe plant. It has a strong stimulant-laxative action.  Aloe emodin is not carcinogenic when applied to the skin, although it may increase the carcinogenicity of some kind of radiation. 

Aloe emodin is found in the gel, sap or leaves of aloe vera, the socotrine aloe, Barbados aloe, and Zanzibar aloes, the bark of Frangula (Rhamnus frangula) and cascara sagrada (Rhamnus purshiana), the leaves of Senna (Cassia angustifolia), and the rhizome of rhubarb (Rheum rhaponticum).
Aloe-emodin has not been found in Natal aloes.

References

See also 
 Emodin

Dihydroxyanthraquinones
3-Hydroxypropenals within hydroxyquinones
Primary alcohols